Ann E. Millikan (born June 10, 1963) is an American composer.

Life and career
Ann Millikan was born in San Diego County, California. She studied music at San José State University, where she graduated with a BA. She went on to graduate with a MFA from the California Institute of the Arts where she studied with Morton Subotnick, Mel Powell and Stephen Mosko. Afterward, she continued her studies in African music and classical voice.

Millikan composes in several genres, including orchestral, opera, choral and instrumental, and her works have been used for purposes such as installation, theatre and dance. Her compositions have been called "dynamic and diverse."

Millikan's works have been performed internationally and are widely available on recorded media. She currently resides in Minnesota.

Honors and awards
Millikan has received grants and awards from the following:

2011 MN State Arts Board Artist Initiative  
2010 McKnight Composer Fellowship 
California Arts Council 
American Music Center 
ASCAP awards
American Composers Forum 
Meet The Composer 
Argosy Foundation Contemporary Music Fund 
Jerome Foundation 
Zellerbach Family Fund 
Berkeley Civic Arts Program 
Waging Peace Through Singing (Highest Honors)

Works
Selected works include:

Orchestra
Trilhas de Sombra		
Ballad Nocturne			
Landing Inside the Inside of an Animal			
Red Migration for orchestra
		
Chamber	
Thunder Woman		
Kuiper Belt Wamfle		
The Woodcarver & The Blacksmith		
Cantando para a Onça		
Choro do Zeitgeist
Red Migration
221B Baker Street	
Trens Coloridos para Gabriela
Three Reflections
K'uei: A SYZYGY

Theater and dance
From The Bottom Drawer
The Color of Blood: Praising the Moon We Are, Part I
The Medicine of the Spiral	
K'uei: A SYZYGY

Strings
From the Bottom Drawer
Choro do Miro
Metal Shop 302

Woodwinds
House of Mirrors I
House of Mirrors II
Calendula
Suite for Woodwinds Quartet
	
Vocal
Water From Your Spring	
The Medicine of the Spiral II: Quartet Improvisations	
My Island
Abstrações

Choral
grandmother walks, mist rises
Choro
Advent Music
O Sapientia – O Wisdom
The One Who Is Coming...
La Vieja
Song of Remembrance
Psalm 78: 14, 15, 17–19, 23-25
Tantum ergo Sacramentum
Ave Maria
I Woman

Opera
Swede Hollow, music and libretto by Ann Millikan

References

1963 births
20th-century classical composers
21st-century American composers
21st-century classical composers
American women classical composers
American classical composers
American opera composers
Living people
People from San Diego County, California
Women opera composers
20th-century American women musicians
21st-century American women musicians
20th-century American composers
Classical musicians from California
20th-century women composers
21st-century women composers